Martina Tomčić (born 6 May 1975) is a Croatian mezzo-soprano opera singer, who is currently a judge on Nova TV's talent show Supertalent.

Biography
Tomčić was born in Zagreb to Croatian parents. Her father, Zlatko Tomčić, is a Croatian politician who served as acting President of Croatia in February 2000, and as Speaker of the Croatian Parliament, while her mother is Slavica Tomčić. She graduated from the High Music School in Graz. In 1995, she won the international singing competition Ferruccio Tagliavini.

Career 
The year 1995 in Graz, she debuted her role as Orlofsky in The Bat, an operetta composed by Johann Strauss. 

In November 2001, she performed in Zagreb as Preziosilla in the opera La forza del destino and in Osijek as Carmen in the eponymous opera.

In 2003, she married Ženja Moskaljov. The couple has a son and a daughter.

References 

1975 births
21st-century Croatian women opera singers
Croatian mezzo-sopranos
Musicians from Zagreb
Living people